The Holy Synod of Milan is an autocephalous True Orthodox jurisdiction.

The church is not recognized by any official Eastern Orthodox Church worldwide therefore it is not in communion with any of them.

Further reading 

 STORIA DEL SANTO SINODO DI MILANO

External links 
Official website of the Holy Synod of Milan

Old Calendarist church bodies and jurisdictions
Christian organizations established in 1984